Serginho is a diminutive form of the given name Sérgio and may refer to:

Footballers primarily known as Serginho
 Serginho (footballer, born 1971), full name Sérgio Cláudio dos Santos, Brazilian international footballer who played for A.C. Milan
 Serginho (footballer, born 1972), full name Sérgio Eduardo Ferreira da Cunha, Brazilian footballer
 Serginho (footballer, born 1974), full name Paulo Sérgio Oliveira da Silva, Brazilian footballer who suffered a cardiac arrest and died on the pitch in 2004
 Serginho (footballer, born 1978), full name Sérgio Severino da Silva, Brazilian footballer, also known as Serginho Pernambucano
 Serginho (footballer, born 1979), full name Sérgio Henrique Silva Guedes, Brazilian footballer
 Serginho (footballer, born May 1980), full name Sérgio Simões de Jesus, Brazilian football midfielder
 Serginho Paulista (footballer, born 1980), full name Sérgio Rodrigo Penteado Dias, Brazilian footballer, also known as Serginho Paulista
 Sérginho (footballer, born 1982), full name Sérgio Gabriel da Silva Andrade, Portuguese footballer
 Serginho (footballer, born 1984), full name Sergio Henrique Francisco, Brazilian footballer
 Serginho (footballer, born 1985), full name Sérgio Fernando Silva Rodrigues, Portuguese footballer
 Serginho (footballer, born 1986), full name Sérgio Antônio Borges Júnior, Brazilian footballer
 Serginho (footballer, born 1988), full name Sérgio Paulo Nascimento Filho, Brazilian footballer
 Serginho (footballer, born 1990), full name Sérgio Ricardo dos Santos Júnior, Brazilian footballer
 Serginho (footballer, born 1991), full name Sérgio Manuel Costa Carneiro, Portuguese footballer
 Serginho (footballer, born 1993), full name Sérgio André Pereira Neves, Portuguese footballer
 Serginho (footballer, born March 1995), full name Sérgio Antônio Soler de Oliveira Junior, Brazilian footballer
 Serginho (footballer, born April 1995), full name Sérgio Antonio De Luiz Junior, Brazilian footballer
 Serginho (footballer, born 1996), full name Sérgio Daniel Sousa Silva, Portuguese footballer
 Sérginho (footballer, born 2000), full name Sérgio Costabile Elia, Brazilian football attacking midfielder
 Serginho (footballer, born 2001), full name Sérgio Pereira Andrade''', Portuguese football winger

Other footballers named or nicknamed Serginho
 Serginho Baiano (born 1978), Brazilian footballer 
 Serginho Catarinense (born 1984), also known as Serginho, Brazilian footballer
 Serginho Chulapa (born 1953), also known as Serginho, Brazilian footballer from the 1982 FIFA World Cup squad
 Sergio van Dijk (born 1982), full name Serginho van Dijk, Dutch footballer
 Serginho Greene (born 1982), Dutch footballer
 Serginho Paulista (footballer, born 1988) (born 1988), full name Sérgio Mendes Coimbra'', Brazilian footballer

Other people known as Serginho
 Serginho Groisman (born 1950), Brazilian television presenter and journalist
 Sérgio Moraes (born 1982), also known as Serginho, Brazilian mixed martial artist and Jiu-Jitsu fighter
 Sérgio Santos (volleyball) (born 1975), known as Serginho or Escadinha, Brazilian volleyball player

See also
 Sergius (name)

Portuguese masculine given names